The Baluchi is a domesticated breed of sheep originating from now southwest Pakistan, Baluchistan, eastern Iran and southern Afghanistan.  It is a member of the fat-tailed breed.  The Baluchi is raised primarily for wool.

Characteristics
This breed is well adapted to arid, subtropical areas in eastern Iran. They are good foragers.

The Baluchi displays black and white with black marks on the head and legs.  Ewes weigh  on average at maturity, lactate for approximately 120 to 130 days and provide  of milk during this period.

Body weight in lambs tends to decline from weaning age to 12 months of age due to no longer being fed by their mother and having to gather food for themselves. 

Body weight differences between single sheep and twin sheep are greater at birth and before weaning, but those differences tend to decrease after weaning. This is because twin sheep have to share their mother's milk.

References

Sheep breeds originating in Pakistan
Balochistan
Economy of Balochistan, Pakistan
Agriculture in Balochistan, Pakistan